A digital buffer (or a voltage buffer) is an electronic circuit element used to isolate an input from an output. The buffer's output state mirrors the input state. The buffer's input impedance is high. It draws little current, to avoid disturbing the input circuit. Also called a unity gain buffer, a digital buffer does not intentionally amplify or attenuate the input signal.

The digital buffer is important in data transmission, translating voltage pulses between connected systems. Buffers are used in registers (data storage device) and buses (data transferring device). A tri-state digital buffer can connect a device to a digital bus. The tri-state buffer's output is either high, low, or disconnected.

Functionality 
A digital buffer transfers a voltage from a high output impedance circuit to a second circuit with low input impedance. Directly connecting a low impedance load to a power source draws current according to Ohm's law. The high current affects the source. Digital buffer inputs are high impedance. A buffered load effectively does not affect the source circuit. The buffer's output current is generated within the buffer. In this way, a buffer provides isolation between a power source and a low impedance input.

Types

Single input voltage buffer

Inverting buffer 
This buffer's output state is the opposite of the input state. If the input is high, the output is low, and vice versa. Graphically, an inverting buffer is represented by a triangle with a small circle at the output, with the circle signifying inversion. The inverter is a basic building block in digital electronics. Decoders, state machines, and other sophisticated digital devices often include inverters.

Non-inverting buffer 
This kind of buffer performs no inversion or decision-making possibilities. A single input digital buffer is different from an inverter. It does not invert or alter its input signal in any way. It reads an input and outputs a value. Usually, the input side reads either HIGH or LOW input and outputs a HIGH or LOW value, correspondingly. Whether the output terminal sends off HIGH or LOW signal is determined by its input value. The output value will be high if and only if the input value is high. In other words, Q will be high if and only if A is HIGH.

Tri-state digital buffer 
Unlike the single input digital buffer which has only one input, Tri-state digital buffer has two inputs: a data input and a control input. (A control input is analogous to a valve, which controls the data flow.) When the control input is active, the output value is the input value, and the buffer is not different from the single input digital buffer.

Active high tri-state digital buffer 
An active high tri-state digital buffer is a buffer with control input high as an active state. When the control input is 1, data transmission occurs. When the control input is 0, 

"Hi-Z" indicates no current and high impedance, as if the part had been removed from the circuit. When the control input is 0, the output is the "Hi-Z" state. When the control input is 1, the data input is transmitted to the output.

Active low tri-state digital buffer 
It is basically the same as active high digital buffer except the fact that the buffer is active when the control input is at a low state.

Inverting tri-state digital buffer 
Tri-State digital buffers also have inverting varieties in which the output is the inverse of the input.

Application 
Single input voltage buffers are used in many places for measurements including:
 In strain gauge circuitry to measure deformations in structures like bridges, airplane wings and I-beams in buildings.
 In temperature measurement circuitry for boilers and in high altitude aircraft in a cold environment.
 In control circuits for aircraft, people movers in airports, subways and in many different production operations.
Tri-state voltage buffers are used widely on buses, which allows multiple devices communicate with each other. A bus can only read one data input from a device at one time, and that is when a tri-state buffer is applied. A tri-state buffer, with its control input, can prevent a bus from reading excessive input.

References 

Electronic circuits